Thomas Seth Pointon (1890 – after 1924) was an English footballer who played in the Football League for Birmingham and Coventry City.

Pointon was born in Evesham, Worcestershire. He began his football career as an amateur with Coventry City and Redditch Town before joining Birmingham, still as an amateur, in August 1913. The club were fined £5 for playing him in the reserves before the transfer formalities had been completed. An outside left, his performances in the reserves were such that he was invited to a trial for England's amateur team, which proved unsuccessful. He made his debut in the Second Division on New Year's Day 1914 in a 2–0 defeat at Stockport County, and played three times more that season, scoring once, but left in April 1914. He played briefly for Redditch, then joined Walsall shortly before the First World War started. After the war he had a season with Nuneaton Town before returning to the Football League with Coventry City. He played twice in the Second Division for Coventry before a third spell with Redditch and finishing his career at Tamworth Castle.

References

1890 births
Year of death missing
People from Evesham
English footballers
Association football wingers
Coventry City F.C. players
Birmingham City F.C. players
Redditch United F.C. players
Walsall F.C. players
Nuneaton Borough F.C. players
Tamworth F.C. players
English Football League players
Date of birth missing
Place of death missing
Sportspeople from Worcestershire